Barathrum is a Finnish black-doom metal band, formed in 1990. The band's name is Latin for pit or abyss. The first letters of their eight full-length albums spell "HEIL SOVA" - referring to the band's frontman, Demonos Sova, who is the only original member of the band. Their music is stylistically similar to early black metal acts such as Venom and Celtic Frost. Their lyrics deal with occult and religious themes.

History

Barathrum was founded at Kuopio, Finland under a name of Darkfeast, which was changed into Barathrum the year after. 

Barathrum recorded several demos during the years 1991-1993. After the demos, Barathrum signed to an underground German record label called Nazgul’s Eyrie Productions which released low budget studio albums "Hailstorm" (1995), "Eerie (1995)" and "Infernal" (1997) before the label went hiatus and left Barathrum as an unsigned artist. 

The band signed to Spinefarm Records record label in 1998 and released five albums, ”Legions Of Perkele” (1998), "Saatana" (1999), ”Okkult" (2000), "Venomous" (2002) and ”Anno Aspera: 2003 Years After Bastard’s Birth” making Barathrum one of the most prominent bands in Finnish black metal scene.

After the years of hiatus, the band was signed to Finnish underground record label Saturnal Records and released their ninth full-length album "Fanatiko (2017)" in April 28th 2017.

Current line-up
Demonos Sova – All instruments, vocals
Anathemalignant – Guitar
Pelcepoop - Guitar
Nuklear Tormentörr – Bass
Ruttokieli - Bass
Pete Vendetta - Drums

Previous members
Aki Hytönen – guitars (1990–1992) (also in Demilich)
Ilu – drums (1990–1992)
Jetblack Roima (1990-1991, 2012-2016)
Niko – guitars (1992–1992)
Neva – guitars (1992–1992)
Bloodbeast – guitars (1992)
Necronom Dethstrike – drums (1992–1992)
Infernus – bass (1992–1996)
Reaper Sklethnor – guitars (1993–1994)
Destrukktorr – drums (1993–1994)
Crowl – bass (1994–1994)
Pimeä – drums (1995–1996)
Sulphur – guitars (1996)
Nattasett – drums (1998) (also in Darkwoods My Betrothed)
Warlord – guitars (1999)
Somnium – guitars (1999–2001) (also in Finntroll, Impaled Nazarene and Thy Serpent)
Beast Dominator – drums (1999) (also in Finntroll, Rapture and Shape of Despair)
Trollhorn – keyboards (2000–2001) (also in Ensiferum, Finntroll and Moonsorrow)
Anathemalignant – guitars (1997–1998, 2000–2004, 2007–2012)
Pelcepoop - guitars (2000-2007)
Abyssir – drums (2000–2007) (also in Ensiferum, Sinergy, ex-Waltari)
G'Thaur – Bass, Vocals (1996–2012) (also in Arthemesia and ex-Korpiklaani)
Agathon – Drums (2007–2010) (also in Soulgrind, ex-Thy Serpent, Walhalla, Gloomy Grim)
Avenger – Drums (ex-Goatmoon, ex-Dauntless) (2011–2012)

Discography

Studio albums
Hailstorm (1994)
Eerie (1995)
Infernal (1997)
Legions of Perkele (1998)
Saatana (1999)
Okkult (2000)
Venomous (2002)
Anno Aspera – 2003 Years After Bastard's Birth (2005)
Fanatiko (2017)

Live albums
Long Live Satan (2009)

EPs and singles
Devilry (EP, 1997)
Jetblack (1997, 7"EP, limited to 666 copies)
Black Flames and Blood (CDS, 2002)
Hellspawn (Single, 2017)

Demos
From Black Flames to Witchcraft (1991)
Witchmaster (1991)
Battlecry (1992)
Sanctissime Colere Satanas (1993)
Sanctus Satanas (Studio & Stage) (1993)
Soaring Up from Hell (1993)

Notes

External links

 Official Barathrum Website – The Blasphemer
 

Finnish doom metal musical groups
Finnish black metal musical groups
Musical groups established in 1990